Sayed Farhad is a Kuwaiti judoka. He competed in the men's heavyweight event at the 1980 Summer Olympics.

References

Year of birth missing (living people)
Living people
Kuwaiti male judoka
Olympic judoka of Kuwait
Judoka at the 1980 Summer Olympics
Place of birth missing (living people)